Okorafor is a Nigerian surname. Notable people with it include:

 Chukwuma Okorafor (born 1997), Nigerian professional American football offensive tackle
 Nnedi Okorafor (born 1974), Nigerian-American writer
 Unoma Ndili Okorafor (born 1974), Nigerian computer scientist and entrepreneur